Ariel Tobias Magcalas (born October 8, 1965) is a Filipino politician.

Political career 
During the Marcos era, as a public servant, Magcalas served during 1985 as chairman of the Kabataang Barangay of the town.

During 1986 (post-Marcos), he became a representative of the Sangguniang Kabataan of Santa Cruz. He won 3 straight terms, as Councilor from 1992 up to 2001.

He ran for Vice-Mayor as an Independent during the 2001 Laguna Local Elections and won. Also, Magcalas ran as Mayor of Santa Cruz during the 2007 Elections and won, He led the town of Santa Cruz in battling typhoons and promoting resiliency. He led the municipality in building evacuation sites. He gained recognition from the Department of Interior and Local Government due to his environmental cleanup campaigns in the town and programs implemented during Typhoon Ketsana up to Typhoon Mirinae (2009).

In 2010, under the banner of Lakas-CMD he ran for reelection, but was defeated by his predecessor Domingo G. Panganiban by 3,733 votes. In a bid to reclaim the mayoralty post, he again run for mayor during the 2013 Laguna local elections under the banner of United Nationalist Alliance, but lost again to Panganiban. He ran again for Mayor on 2016 Laguna local elections and lost again to Panganiban. He again tried to reclaim the mayoralty post along with his running mate, three-termer councilor Laarni A. Malibiran who the latter won during the 2019 Laguna local elections, but he lost to former Congressman Edgar San Luis.

Political Theme
As Mayor, Magcalas delivered transparency to the citizens of Santa Cruz during his term, setting up tents for the evacuation center. Laguna gained recognition as one of the cleanest towns of Laguna. His motto was Agresibong Tumulong at Maglingkod.

References 

Living people
Mayors of places in Laguna (province)
20th-century Filipino politicians
21st-century Filipino politicians
Lakas–CMD (1991) politicians
United Nationalist Alliance politicians
Katipunan ng Demokratikong Pilipino politicians
1965 births